The Kangxi Emperor (4 May 1654– 20 December 1722), also known by his temple name Emperor Shengzu of Qing, born Xuanye, was the third emperor of the Qing dynasty, and the second Qing emperor to rule over China proper, reigning from 1661 to 1722.

The Kangxi Emperor's reign of 61 years makes him the longest-reigning emperor in Chinese history (although his grandson, the Qianlong Emperor, had the longest period of de facto power, ascending as an adult and maintaining effective power until his death) and one of the longest-reigning rulers in history. However, since he ascended the throne at the age of seven, actual power was held for six years by four regents and his grandmother, the Grand Empress Dowager Zhaosheng.

The Kangxi Emperor is considered one of China's greatest emperors. He suppressed the Revolt of the Three Feudatories, forced the Kingdom of Tungning in Taiwan and assorted Mongol rebels in the North and Northwest to submit to Qing rule, and blocked Tsarist Russia on the Amur River, retaining Outer Manchuria.

The Kangxi Emperor's reign brought about long-term stability and relative wealth after years of war and chaos. He initiated the period known as the "Prosperous Era of Kangxi and Qianlong" or "High Qing", which lasted for several generations after his death. His court also accomplished such literary feats as the compilation of the Kangxi Dictionary and Quan Tangshi poetry anthology.

Early reign
Born on 4 May 1654 to the Shunzhi Emperor and Empress Xiaokangzhang in Jingren Palace, the Forbidden City, Beijing, the Kangxi Emperor was originally given the personal name Xuanye (Manchu transliteration: hiowan yei). He was enthroned at the age of seven (or eight by East Asian age reckoning), on 7 February 1661. However, his era name "Kangxi", only started to be used on 18February 1662, the first day of the following lunar year.

Sinologist Herbert Giles, drawing on contemporary sources, described the Kangxi Emperor as "fairly tall and well proportioned, he loved all manly exercises, and devoted three months annually to hunting. Large bright eyes lighted up his face, which was pitted with smallpox."

Before the Kangxi Emperor came to the throne, Grand Empress Dowager Zhaosheng (in the name of Shunzhi Emperor) had appointed the powerful men Sonin, Suksaha, Ebilun, and Oboi as regents. Sonin died after his granddaughter became Empress Xiaochengren, leaving Suksaha at odds with Oboi in politics. In a fierce power struggle, Oboi had Suksaha put to death and seized absolute power as sole regent. The Kangxi Emperor and the rest of the imperial court acquiesced to this arrangement.

In the spring of 1662, the regents ordered a Great Clearance in southern China that evacuated the entire population from the seacoast to counter a resistance movement started by Ming loyalists under the leadership of Taiwan-based Ming general Zheng Chenggong, also titled Koxinga.

In 1669, the Kangxi Emperor had Oboi arrested with the help of his grandmother Grand Empress Dowager Zhaosheng, who had raised him. and began taking personal control of the empire. He listed three issues of concern: flood control of the Yellow River; repair of the Grand Canal; the Revolt of the Three Feudatories in south China. The Grand Empress Dowager influenced him greatly and he took care of her himself in the months leading up to her death in 1688.

Kangxi's relatives from the Han Chinese Banner Tong 佟 clan of Fushun in Liaoning falsely claimed to be related to the Jurchen Manchu Tunggiya 佟佳 clan of Jilin, using this false claim to get themselves transferred to a Manchu banner in the reign of Kangxi emperor.

Military achievements

Army

The main army of the Qing Empire, the Eight Banners Army, was in decline under the Kangxi Emperor. It was smaller than it had been at its peak under Hong Taiji and in the early reign of the Shunzhi Emperor; however, it was larger than in the Yongzheng and Qianlong emperors' reigns. In addition, the Green Standard Army was still powerful with generals such as Tuhai, Fei Yanggu, Zhang Yong, Zhou Peigong, Shi Lang, Mu Zhan, Shun Shike and Wang Jingbao.

The main reason for this decline was a change in system between the Kangxi and Qianlong emperors' reigns. The Kangxi Emperor continued using the traditional military system implemented by his predecessors, which was more efficient and stricter. According to the system, a commander who returned from a battle alone (with all his men dead) would be put to death, and likewise for a foot soldier. This was meant to motivate both commanders and soldiers alike to fight valiantly in war because there was no benefit for the sole survivor in a battle.

By the Qianlong Emperor's reign, military commanders had become lax and the training of the army was deemed less important as compared to during the previous emperors' reigns.

Revolt of the Three Feudatories

After the Qing takeover of China in 1644, large parts of the south and west were given as fiefs to three Ming generals who aided the Qing; in 1673 the three feudatories were controlled by Wu Sangui, Geng Jingzhong, and Shang Zhixin. Going against the advice of most of his advisors, Kangxi attempted to force the feudal princes to give up their lands and retire to Manchuria, sparking a rebellion that lasted eight years. For years afterwards Kangxi ruminated on his mistakes and blamed himself in part for the loss of life during the revolt.

Wu Sangui's forces overran most of southwest China and he tried to ally himself with local generals such as Wang Fuchen. The Kangxi Emperor employed generals including Zhou Peigong and Tuhai to suppress the rebellion, and also granted clemency to common people caught up in the war. He intended to personally lead the armies to crush the rebels but his subjects advised him against it. The Kangxi Emperor used mainly Han Chinese Green Standard Army soldiers to crush the rebels while the Manchu Banners took a backseat. The revolt ended with victory for Qing forces in 1681.

Taiwan

In 1683, the naval forces of the Ming loyalists on Taiwan—organized under the Zheng dynasty as the Kingdom of Tungning—were defeated off Penghu by 300-odd ships under the Qing admiral Shi Lang. Koxinga's grandson Zheng Keshuang surrendered Tungning a few days later and Taiwan became part of the Qing Empire. Zheng Keshuang moved to Beijing, joined the Qing nobility as the "Duke Haicheng", and was inducted into the Eight Banners as a member of the Han Plain Red Banner. His soldiers—including the rattan-shield troops (tengpaiying)—were similarly entered into the Eight Banners, notably serving against Russian Cossacks at Albazin.

A score of Ming princes had joined the Zheng dynasty on Taiwan, including Prince Zhu Shugui of Ningjing and Prince Honghuan (朱弘桓), the son of Zhu Yihai. The Qing sent most of the 17 Ming princes still living on Taiwan back to mainland China, where they spent the rest of their lives. The Prince of Ningjing and his five concubines, however, committed suicide rather than submit to capture. Their palace was used as Shi Lang's headquarters in 1683, but he memorialized the emperor to convert it into a Mazu temple as a propaganda measure in quieting remaining resistance on Taiwan. The emperor approved its dedication as the Grand Matsu Temple the next year and, honoring the goddess Mazu for her supposed assistance during the Qing invasion, promoted her to "Empress of Heaven" ( Tianhou) from her previous status as a "heavenly consort" ( Tianfei). Belief in Mazu remains so widespread on Taiwan that her annual celebrations can gather hundreds of thousands of people; she is sometimes even syncretized with Guanyin and the Virgin Mary.

The end of the rebel stronghold and capture of the Ming princes allowed the Kangxi Emperor to relax the Sea Ban and permit resettlement of the Fujian and Guangdong coasts. The financial and other incentives to new settlers particularly drew the Hakka, who would have continuous low-level conflict with the returning Punti people for the next few centuries.

Russia

In the 1650s, the Qing Empire engaged the Tsardom of Russia in a series of border conflicts along the Amur River region, which concluded with the Qing gaining control of the area after the Siege of Albazin.

The Russians invaded the northern frontier again in the 1680s. A series of battles and negotiations culminated in the Treaty of Nerchinsk of 1689, by which a border was agreed between Russia and China.

Mongolia
The Inner Mongolian Chahar leader Ligdan Khan, a descendant of Genghis Khan, opposed and fought against the Qing until he died of smallpox in 1634. Thereafter, the Inner Mongols under his son Ejei Khan surrendered to the Qing and he was given the title of Prince (Qin Wang, 親王). The Inner Mongolian nobility now became closely tied to the Qing royal family and intermarried with them extensively. Ejei Khan died in 1661 and was succeeded by his brother Abunai. After Abunai showed disaffection with Manchu Qing rule, he was placed under house arrest in 1669 in Shenyang and the Kangxi Emperor gave his title to his son Borni.

Abunai bided his time then, with his brother Lubuzung, revolted against the Qing in 1675 during the Revolt of the Three Feudatories, with 3,000 Chahar Mongol followers joining in on the revolt. The revolt was put down within two months, the Qing defeating the rebels in battle on 20 April 1675, killing Abunai and all his followers. Their title was abolished, all Chahar Mongol royal males were executed even if they were born to Manchu Qing princesses, and all Chahar Mongol royal females were sold into slavery except the Manchu Qing princesses. The Chahar Mongols were then put under the direct control of the Qing Emperor unlike the other Inner Mongol leagues which maintained their autonomy.

The Outer Khalkha Mongols had preserved their independence, and only paid tribute to the Qing Empire. However, a conflict between the houses of Jasagtu Khan and Tösheetü Khan led to a dispute between the Khalkha and the Dzungars over the influence of Tibetan Buddhism. In 1688, the Dzungar chief, Galdan Boshugtu Khan, attacked the Khalkha from the west and invaded their territory. The Khalkha royal families and the first Jebtsundamba Khutuktu crossed the Gobi Desert and sought help from the Qing Empire in return for submission to Qing authority. In 1690, the Dzungars and Qing forces clashed at the Battle of Ulan Butung in Inner Mongolia, in which the Qing eventually emerged as the victor.

In 1696 and 1697 the Kangxi Emperor personally led campaigns against the Dzungars in the early Dzungar–Qing War. The western section of the Qing army defeated Galdan's forces at the Battle of Jao Modo and Galdan died in the following year.

Manchu Hoifan and Ula rebellion against the Qing

In 1700, some 20,000 Qiqihar Xibe were resettled in Guisui, modern Inner Mongolia, and 36,000 Songyuan Xibe were resettled in Shenyang, Liaoning. The relocation of the Xibe from Qiqihar is believed by Liliya M. Gorelova to be linked to the Qing's annihilation of the Manchu clan Hoifan (Hoifa) in 1697 and the Manchu tribe Ula in 1703 after they rebelled against the Qing; both Hoifan and Ula were wiped out.

Tibet
In 1701, the Kangxi Emperor ordered the reconquest of Kangding and other border towns in western Sichuan that had been taken by the Tibetans. The Manchu forces stormed Dartsedo and secured the border with Tibet and the lucrative tea-horse trade.

The Tibetan desi (regent) Sangye Gyatso concealed the death of the 5th Dalai Lama in 1682, and only informed the emperor in 1697. He moreover kept relations with Dzungar enemies of the Qing. All this evoked the great displeasure of the Kangxi Emperor. Eventually Sangye Gyatso was toppled and killed by the Khoshut ruler Lha-bzang Khan in 1705. As a reward for ridding him of his old enemy the Dalai Lama, the Kangxi Emperor appointed Lha-bzang Khan Regent of Tibet. The Dzungar Khanate, a confederation of Oirat tribes based in parts of what is now Xinjiang, continued to threaten the Qing Empire and invaded Tibet in 1717. They took control of Lhasa with a 6,000 strong army and killed Lha-bzang Khan. The Dzungars held on to the city for three years and at the Battle of the Salween River defeated a Qing army sent to the region in 1718. The Qing did not take control of Lhasa until 1720, when the Kangxi Emperor sent a larger expedition force there to defeat the Dzungars.

Muslims
Manchu emperor Kangxi incited anti-Muslim sentiment among the Mongols of Qinghai (Kokonor) in order to gain support against the Dzungar Oirat Mongol leader Galdan. Kangxi claimed that Chinese Muslims inside China such as Turkic Muslims in Qinghai (Kokonor) were plotting with Galdan, who he falsely claimed converted to Islam. Kangxi falsely claimed that Galdan had spurned and turned his back on Buddhism and the Dalai Lama and that he was plotting to install a Muslim as ruler of China after invading it in a conspiracy with Chinese Muslims. Kangxi also distrusted Muslims of Turfan and  Hami.

Chinese nobility
The Kangxi Emperor granted the title of Wujing Boshi (五經博士; Wǔjīng Bóshì) to the descendants of Shao Yong, Zhu Xi, Zhuansun Shi, Ran family (Ran Qiu, Ran Geng, Ran Yong), Bu Shang, Yan Yan (disciple of Confucius), and the Duke of Zhou's offspring.

Economic achievements

The contents of the national treasury during the Kangxi Emperor's reign were:
1668 (7th year of Kangxi): 14,930,000 taels
1692: 27,385,631 taels
1702–1709: approximately 50,000,000 taels with little variation during this period
1710: 45,880,000 taels
1718: 44,319,033 taels
1720: 39,317,103 taels
1721 (60th year of Kangxi, second last of his reign): 32,622,421 taels

The reasons for the declining trend in the later years of the Kangxi Emperor's reign were a huge expenditure on military campaigns and an increase in corruption. To fix the problem, the Kangxi Emperor gave Prince Yong (the future Yongzheng Emperor) advice  on how to make the economy more efficient.

Cultural achievements

During his reign, the Kangxi Emperor ordered the compilation of a dictionary of Chinese characters, which became known as the Kangxi Dictionary. This was seen as an attempt by the emperor to gain support from the Han Chinese scholar-bureaucrats, as many of them initially refused to serve him and remained loyal to the Ming dynasty. However, by persuading the scholars to work on the dictionary without asking them to formally serve the Qing imperial court, the Kangxi Emperor led them to gradually taking on greater responsibilities until they were assuming the duties of state officials.

In 1705, on the Kangxi Emperor's order, a compilation of Tang poetry, the Quan Tangshi, was produced.

The Kangxi Emperor also was interested in Western technology and wanted to import them to China. This was done through Jesuit missionaries, such as Ferdinand Verbiest, whom the Kangxi Emperor frequently summoned for meetings, or Karel Slavíček, who made the first precise map of Beijing on the emperor's order.

From 1711 to 1723, Matteo Ripa, an Italian priest sent to China by the Congregation for the Evangelization of Peoples, worked as a painter and copper-engraver at the Qing court. In 1723, he returned to Naples from China with four young Chinese Christians, in order to groom them to become priests and send them back to China as missionaries. This marked the beginning of the Collegio dei Cinesi, sanctioned by Pope Clement XII to help the evangelization of Christianity in China. This Chinese Institute was the first school of Sinology in Europe, which would later develop to become the Istituto Orientale and the present day Naples Eastern University.

The Kangxi Emperor was also the first Chinese emperor to play a western musical instrument. Thomas Pereira taught him how to play the harpsichord, and he employed Karel Slavíček as court musician. Slavíček was playing Spinet; later the emperor would play on it himself. China's famed blue and white porcelain probably reached its zenith during the Kangxi Emperor's reign.

Christianity

In the early decades of the Kangxi Emperor's reign, Jesuits played a large role in the imperial court. With their knowledge of astronomy, they ran the imperial observatory. Jean-François Gerbillon and Thomas Pereira served as translators for the negotiations of the Treaty of Nerchinsk. The Kangxi Emperor was grateful to the Jesuits for their contributions, the many languages they could interpret, and the innovations they offered his military in gun manufacturing and artillery, the latter of which enabled the Qing Empire to conquer the Kingdom of Tungning.

The Kangxi Emperor was also fond of the Jesuits' respectful and unobtrusive manner; they spoke the Chinese language well, and wore the silk robes of the elite. In 1692, when Pereira requested tolerance for Christianity, the Kangxi Emperor was willing to oblige, and issued the Edict of Toleration, which recognized Catholicism, barred attacks on their churches, and legalized their missions and the practice of Christianity by the Chinese people.

However, controversy arose over whether Chinese Christians could still take part in traditional Confucian ceremonies and ancestor worship, with the Jesuits arguing for tolerance and the Dominicans taking a hard-line against foreign "idolatry". The Dominican position won the support of Pope Clement XI, who in 1705 sent Charles-Thomas Maillard de Tournon as his representative to the Kangxi Emperor, to communicate the ban on Chinese rites. Through de Tournon, the Pope insisted on sending his own representative to Beijing to oversee Jesuit missionaries in China. Kangxi refused, wanting to keep missionary activities in China under his final oversight, managed by one of the Jesuits who had been living in Beijing for years.

On 19 March 1715, Pope Clement XI issued the papal bull Ex illa die, which officially condemned Chinese rites. In response, the Kangxi Emperor officially forbade Christian missions in China, as they were "causing trouble".

Succession disputes

A prolonged struggle between various princes emerged during the Kangxi Emperor's reign over who should inherit the throne – the Nine Lords' War.

In 1674 the Kangxi Emperor's first spouse, Empress Xiaochengren, died while giving birth to his second surviving son Yinreng, who at the age of two was named crown prince – a Han Chinese custom, to ensure stability during a time of chaos in the south. Although the Kangxi Emperor left the education of several of his sons to others, he personally oversaw the upbringing of Yinreng, grooming him to be a perfect successor. Yinreng was tutored by the mandarin Wang Shan, who remained devoted to him, and spent the later years of his life trying to persuade the Kangxi Emperor to restore Yinreng as the crown prince.

Yinreng proved to be unworthy of the succession despite his father showing favoritism towards him. He was said to have beaten and killed his subordinates, and was alleged to have had sexual relations with one of his father's concubines, which was deemed incest and a capital offence. Yinreng also purchased young children from Jiangsu to satisfy his pedophiliac pleasure. In addition, Yinreng's supporters, led by Songgotu, gradually formed a "Crown Prince Party" (太子黨), that aimed to help Yinreng get the throne as soon as possible, even if it meant using unlawful methods.

Over the years, the Kangxi Emperor kept constant watch over Yinreng and became aware of his son's many flaws, while their relationship gradually deteriorated. In 1707, the emperor decided that he could no longer tolerate Yinreng's behavior, which he partially mentioned in the imperial edict as "never obeying ancestors' virtues, never obliged to my order, only doing inhumanity and devilry, only showing maliciousness and lust", and decided to strip Yinreng of his position as crown prince. The Kangxi Emperor placed his oldest surviving son, Yinzhi, in charge of overseeing Yinreng's house arrest. Yinzhi, an unfavored Shu son, knowing he had no chance of being selected, recommended the eighth prince, Yinsi, and requested his father to order Yinreng's execution. The Kangxi Emperor was enraged and stripped Yinzhi of his titles. The emperor then commanded his subjects to cease debating the succession issue, but despite this and attempts to reduce rumours and speculation as to who the new crown prince might be, the imperial court's daily activities were disrupted. Yinzhi's actions caused the Kangxi Emperor to suspect that Yinreng might have been framed, so he restored Yinreng as crown prince in 1709, with the support of the 4th and 13th princes, and on the excuse that Yinreng had previously acted under the influence of mental illness.

In 1712, during the Kangxi Emperor's last inspection tour of the south, Yinreng, who was put in charge of state affairs during his father's absence, tried to vie for power again with his supporters. He allowed an attempt at forcing the Kangxi Emperor to abdicate when his father returned to Beijing. However, the emperor received news of the planned coup d'etat, and was so angry that he deposed Yinreng and placed him under house arrest again. After the incident, the emperor announced that he would not appoint any of his sons as crown prince for the remainder of his reign. He stated that he would place his Imperial Valedictory Will inside a box in the Palace of Heavenly Purity, which would only be opened after his death.

Seeing that Yinreng was completely disavowed, Yinsi and some other princes turned to support the 14th prince, Yinti, while the 13th prince supported Yinzhen. They formed the so-called "Eighth Lord Party" and "Fourth Lord Party".

Death and succession

Following the deposition of the crown prince, the Kangxi Emperor implemented groundbreaking changes in the political landscape. The 13th prince, Yinxiang, was placed under house arrest as well for cooperating with Yinreng. The eighth prince Yinsi was stripped of all his titles and only had them restored years later. The 14th prince Yinti, whom many considered to be the most likely candidate to succeed the Kangxi Emperor, was sent on a military campaign during the political conflict. Yinsi, along with the ninth and tenth princes, Yintang and Yin'e, pledged their support to Yinti.

In the evening of 20 December 1722 before his death, the Kangxi Emperor called seven of his sons to assemble at his bedside. They were the third, fourth, eighth, ninth, tenth, sixteenth and seventeenth princes. After the Kangxi Emperor died, Longkodo announced that the emperor had selected the fourth prince, Yinzhen, as the new emperor. Yinzhen ascended to the throne and became known as the Yongzheng Emperor. The Kangxi Emperor was entombed at the Eastern Tombs in Zunhua, Hebei.

A legend concerning the Kangxi Emperor's will states that he chose Yinti as his heir, but Yinzhen forged the will in his own favour. It has, however, long been refuted by serious historians. Yinzhen, later the Yongzheng Emperor, has attracted many rumours, and some novel-like private books claim he did not die of illness but was assassinated by a swordswoman, Lü Siniang, the granddaughter of Lü Liuliang, though this is never treated seriously by scholars.

Personality and achievements

The Kangxi Emperor was a great consolidator of the Qing dynasty. The transition from the Ming dynasty to the Qing was a cataclysm whose central event was the fall of the capital Beijing to the peasant rebels led by Li Zicheng, then to the Manchus in 1644, and the installation of the five-year-old Shunzhi Emperor on their throne. By 1661, when the Shunzhi Emperor died and was succeeded by the Kangxi Emperor, the Qing conquest of China proper was almost complete. Leading Manchus were already using Chinese institutions and mastering Confucian ideology, while maintaining Manchu culture among themselves. The Kangxi Emperor completed the conquest, suppressed all significant military threats and revived the central government system inherited from the Ming with important modifications.

The Kangxi Emperor was a workaholic, rising early and retiring late, reading and responding to numerous memorials every day, conferring with his councilors and giving audiences – and this was in normal times; in wartime, he might be reading memorials from the warfront until after midnight or even, as with the Dzungar conflict, away on campaign in person.

The Kangxi Emperor devised a system of communication that circumvented the scholar-bureaucrats, who had a tendency to usurp the power of the emperor. This Palace Memorial System involved the transfer of secret messages between him and trusted officials in the provinces, where the messages were contained in locked boxes that only he and the official had access to. This started as a system for receiving uncensored extreme-weather reports, which the emperor regarded as divine comments on his rule. However, it soon evolved into a general-purpose secret "news channel." Out of this emerged a Grand Council, which dealt with extraordinary, especially military, events. The council was chaired by the emperor and manned by his more elevated Han Chinese and Manchu household staff. From this council, the mandarin civil servants were excluded – they were left only with routine administration.

The Kangxi Emperor managed to woo the Confucian intelligentsia into co-operating with the Qing government, despite their deep reservations about Manchu rule and loyalty to the Ming. He appealed to this very sense of Confucian values, for instance, by issuing the Sacred Edict in 1670. He encouraged Confucian learning and made sure that the civil service examinations were held every three years even during times of stress. When some scholars, out of loyalty to the Ming, refused to take the exams, he hit upon the expedient of a special exam to be taken by nomination. He personally sponsored the writing of the Ming Official History, the Kangxi Dictionary, a phrase-dictionary, a vast encyclopedia and an even vaster compilation of Chinese literature. To promote his image as a "sage ruler," he appointed Manchu and Chinese tutors with whom he studied the Confucian classics and worked intensively on Chinese calligraphy.

In the one military campaign in which he actively participated, against the Dzungar Mongols, the Kangxi Emperor showed himself an effective military commander. According to Finer, the emperor's own written reflections allow one to experience "how intimate and caring was his communion with the rank-and-file, how discriminating and yet masterful his relationship with his generals".

As a result of the scaling down of hostilities as peace returned to China after the Manchu conquest, and also as a result of the ensuing rapid increase of population, land cultivation and therefore tax revenues based on agriculture, the Kangxi Emperor was able first to make tax remissions, then in 1712 to freeze the land tax and corvée altogether, without embarrassing the state treasury (although the dynasty eventually suffered from this fiscal policy).

Family 
Empress

 Empress Xiaochengren (孝誠仁皇后) of the Hešeri clan (赫舍里氏) (3 February 1654 – 6 June 1674)
 Chenghu (承祜; 4 January 1670 – 3 March 1672), 2nd son
 Yunreng, Prince Limi of the First Rank (理密親王 允礽; 6 June 1674 – 27 January 1725), 7th (2nd) son

 Empress Xiaozhaoren (孝昭仁皇后) of the Niohuru clan (鈕祜祿氏) (1659 – 18 March 1678)
 Empress Xiaoyiren (孝懿仁皇后) of the Tunggiya clan (佟佳氏) (d. 24 August 1689)
 8th daughter (13 July 1683 – 6 August 1683)
 Miscarriage (August 1689)

 Empress Xiaogongren (孝恭仁皇后) of the Uya clan (烏雅氏) (28 April 1660 – 25 June 1723)
 Yinzhen (胤禛; 13 December 1678 – 8 October 1735), the Yongzheng Emperor (雍正帝), 11th (4th) son
 Yinzuo (胤祚; 5 March 1680 – 15 June 1685), 14th (6th) son
 7th daughter (5 July 1682 – September 1682)
 Princess Wenxian of the First Rank (固倫溫憲公主; 10 November 1683 – August/September 1702), 9th daughter
 Married Shun'anyan (舜安顏; d. 1724) of the Manchu Tunggiya clan in October/November 1700.
 12th daughter (14 June 1686 – February/March 1697)
 Yunti, Prince Xunqin of the Second Rank (恂勤郡王 允禵; 10 February 1688 – 16 February 1755), 23rd (14th) son

Imperial Noble Consort

 Imperial Noble Consort Quehui (愨惠皇貴妃) of the Tunggiya clan (佟佳氏) (September/October 1668 – 24 April 1743)
 Imperial Noble Consort Jingmin (敬敏皇貴妃) of the Janggiya clan (章佳氏) (d. 20 August 1699)
 Yinxiang, Prince Yixian of the First Rank (怡賢親王 胤祥; 16 November 1686 – 18 June 1730), 22nd (13th) son
 Princess Wenke of the Second Rank (和碩溫恪公主; 31 December 1687 – 27 July 1709), 13th daughter
 Married Cangjin (蒼津) of the Mongol Onnigud Borjigin clan in August/September 1706.
 Princess Dunke of the Second Rank (和碩敦恪公主; 3 February 1691 – 2 January 1710), 15th daughter
 Married Dorji (多爾濟; d. 1720) of the Mongol Khorchin Borjigin clan in January/February 1709, and had issue (one daughter).

 Imperial Noble Consort Dunyi (惇怡皇貴妃) of the Gūwalgiya clan (瓜爾佳氏) (3 December 1683 – 30 April 1768)
 18th daughter (17 November 1701 – November 1701)

Noble Consort

 Noble Consort Wenxi (溫僖貴妃) of the Niohuru clan (鈕祜祿氏) (14 February 1661 – 19 December 1694)
 Yun'e, Duke of the Second Rank (輔國公 允䄉; 28 November 1683 – 18 October 1741), 18th (10th) son
 11th daughter (24 October 1685 – June/July 1686)

Consort

 Consort Hui (慧妃) of the Khorchin Borjigin clan (博爾濟吉特氏) (d. 30 May 1670)
 Consort Hui (惠妃) of the Ula-Nara clan (葉赫那拉氏) (d. 1 May 1732)
 Chengqing (承慶; 21 March 1670 – 26 May 1671), 3rd son
 Yunzhi, Prince of the Fourth Rank (貝子 允禔; 12 March 1672 – 7 January 1735), 5th (1st) son

 Consort Yi (宜妃) of the Gorolo clan (郭絡羅氏) (1660 – 2 October 1733)
 Yunki, Prince Hengwen of the First Rank (恆溫親王 允祺; 5 January 1680 – 10 July 1732), 13th (5th) son
 Yuntang, Prince of the Fourth Rank (貝子 允禟; 17 October 1683 – 22 September 1726), 17th (9th) son
 Yinzi (胤禌; 8 June 1685 – 22 August 1696), 20th (11th) son

 Consort Rong (榮妃) of the Magiya clan (馬佳氏) (d. 26 April 1727)
 Chengrui (承瑞; 5 November 1667 – 10 July 1670), 1st son
 Saiyinchahun (賽音察渾; 24 January 1672 – 6 March 1674), 4th son
 Princess Rongxian of the First Rank (固倫榮憲公主; 20 June 1673 – 29 May 1728), 3rd daughter
 Married Örgen (烏爾袞; d. 1721) of the Mongol Barin Borjigin clan in June/July 1691 and had issue (a son).
 Changhua (長華; 11 May 1674), 6th son
 Changsheng (長生; 10 September 1675 – 27 April 1677), 8th son
 Yunzhi, Prince Chengyin of the Second Rank (誠隱郡王 允祉; 23 March 1677 – 10 July 1732), 10th (3rd) son

 Consort Ping (平妃) of the Hešeri clan (赫舍里氏) (d. 18 July 1696)
 Yinji (胤禨; 23 February 1691 – 30 March 1691), 24th son

 Consort Liang (良妃) of the Wei clan (衛氏) (1662 – 29 December 1711)
 Yunsi, Prince Lian of the First Rank (廉親王 允禩; 29 March 1681 – 5 October 1726), 16th (8th) son

 Consort Xuan (宣妃) of the Khorchin Borjigin clan (博爾濟吉特氏) (d. 12 September 1736), personal name Chenglian (成蓮)
 Consort Cheng (成妃) of the Daigiya clan (戴佳氏) (d. 18 December 1740)
 Yunyou, Prince Chundu of the First Rank (淳度親王 允佑; 19 August 1680 – 18 May 1730), 15th (7th) son

 Consort Shunyimi (順懿密妃) of the Wang clan (王氏) (d. 19 November 1744)
 Yunxu, Prince Yuke of the Second Rank (愉恪郡王 允禑; 24 December 1693 – 8 March 1731), 25th (15th) son
 Yunlu, Prince Zhuangke of the First Rank (莊恪親王 允祿; 28 July 1695 – 20 March 1767), 26th (16th) son
 Yinxie (胤祄; 15 May 1701 – 17 October 1708), 28th (18th) son

 Consort Chunyuqin (純裕勤妃) of the Chen clan (陳氏) (d. 12 January 1754)
 Yunli, Prince Guoyi of the First Rank (果毅親王 允禮; 24 March 1697 – 21 March 1738), 27th (17th) son

 Consort Ding (定妃) of the Wanlioha clan (萬琉哈氏) (January/February 1661 – 24 May 1757)
 Yuntao, Prince Lüyi of the First Rank (履懿親王 允祹; 18 January 1686 – 1 September 1763), 21st (12th) son

Concubine

 Concubine An (安嬪) of the Li clan (李氏)
 Concubine Jing (敬嬪) of the Wanggiya clan (王佳氏)
 Concubine Duan (端嬪) of the Dong clan (董氏) (d. 1702)
 2nd daughter (17 April 1671 – March/April 1673)

 Concubine Xi (僖嬪) of the Hešeri clan (赫舍里氏) (d. 31 October 1702)
 Concubine Tong (通嬪) of the Ula-Nara clan (那拉氏) (1664 – 1 August 1744)
 Princess Chunque of the First Rank (固倫純慤公主; 20 March 1685 – 22 April 1710), 10th daughter
 Married Ts'ering (策棱; d. 1750) of the Mongol Khalkha Borjigin clan in June/July 1706, and had issue (one son).

 Concubine Xiang (襄嬪) of the Gao clan (高氏) (d. 14 August 1746)
 Yinji (胤禝; 25 October 1702 – 28 March 1704), 29th (19th) son
 19th daughter (30 March 1703 – February/March 1705)
 Yunyi, Prince Jianjing of the Third Rank (簡靖貝勒 允禕; 1 September 1706 – 30 June 1755), 30th (20th) son

 Concubine Jin (謹嬪) of the Sehetu clan (色赫圖氏) (2 August 1682 – 23 April 1739)
 Yunhu, Prince Gongqin of the Third Rank (恭勤貝勒 允祜; 10 January 1712 – 12 February 1744), 32nd (22nd) son

 Concubine Jing (靜嬪) of the Shi clan (石氏) (13 December 1689 – 10 July 1758)
 Yunci, Prince Cheng of the Third Rank (誠貝勒 允祁; 14 January 1714 – 31 August 1785), 33rd (23rd) son

 Concubine Xi (熙嬪) of the Chen clan (陳氏) (April/May 1690 – 1 February 1737)
 Yunxi, Prince Shenjing of the Second Rank (慎靖郡王 允禧; 27 February 1711 – 26 June 1758), 31st (21st) son

 Concubine Mu (穆嬪) of the Chen clan (陳氏) (d. 1727)
 Yunbi, Prince Xianke of the First Rank (𫍯恪親王 允秘; 5 July 1716 – 3 December 1773), 34th (24th) son
 Yinyuan (胤禐; 2 March 1718), 35th son

Noble Lady

 Noble Lady Yi (伊貴人) of the Yi clan (易氏) (d. 1728)
 Noble Lady Bu (布貴人) of the Joogiya clan (兆佳氏) (d. 21 February 1717)
 Princess Duanjing of the Second Rank (和碩端靜公主; 9 June 1674 – March/April 1710), 5th daughter
 Married Ga'erzang (噶爾臧; 1675–1722) of the Mongol Kharchin Ulanghan clan in November/December 1692, and had issue (one daughter).

 Noble Lady (貴人) of the Nara clan (那拉氏)
 Wanfu (萬黼; 4 December 1675 – 11 March 1679), 9th son
 Yinzan (胤禶; 10 April 1679 – 30 April 1680), 12th son

 Noble Lady (貴人) of the Gorolo clan (郭絡羅氏)
 Princess Kejing of the First Rank (固倫恪靖公主; 4 July 1679 – March/April 1735), 6th daughter
 Married Dondob Dorji (敦多布多爾濟; d. 1743) of the Mongol Khalkha Borjigin clan in December 1697 or January 1698 and had issue (three sons).
 Yinju (胤䄔; 13 September 1683 – 17 July 1684), 19th son

 Noble Lady (貴人) of the Yuan clan (袁氏) (d. 25 September 1719)
 Princess Quejing of the Second Rank (和碩愨靖公主; 16 January 1690 – 1736), 14th daughter
 Married Sun Chengyun (孫承運; d. 1719) in 1706.

Mistress

 Mistress (格格) of the Zhang clan (張氏)
 1st daughter (23 December 1668 – November 1671)
 4th daughter (16 March 1674 – January/February 1679)

 Mistress (格格) of the Wang clan (王氏)
 16th daughter (27 November 1695 – October/November 1707)

 Mistress (格格) of the Liu clan (劉氏)
 17th daughter (12 January 1699 – December 1700 or January 1701)

 Mistress (格格) of the Niohuru clan (鈕祜祿氏)
 20th daughter (20 November 1708 – January/February 1709)

Ancestry

In popular culture

Fiction
 The Great Kangxi Emperor, a historical novel by Eryue He which romanticises the Kangxi Emperor's life.
 The Deer and the Cauldron, a wuxia novel by Jin Yong. In the novel, the Kangxi Emperor and the protagonist, Wei Xiaobao, become close friends in their childhood. Wei Xiaobao helps the emperor consolidate his rule over the Qing Empire and plays an important role in affecting how significant historical events during the Kangxi era unfold.
 Seven Swords Descend from Mount Heaven, a wuxia novel by Liang Yusheng. In the novel, the Kangxi Emperor discovers that his father, the Shunzhi Emperor, has become a monk in a monastery on Mount Wutai. He orders a close aide to kill his father in order to consolidate power, and attempts to erase evidence of the murder later.

Film and television

Video games 
 Age of Empires III: The Asian Dynasties: The Kangxi Emperor is featured as the Chinese leader in this real-time strategy game.
 Call Me Emperor: Kangxi is featured as a minister in this Strategy Click-RPG game.

See also 
 Chinese emperors family tree (late)
 Kangxi Tongbao

Notes

References

Bibliography and further reading 
 
 .
 Finer, S. E. (1997). The History of Government from the Earliest Times.  (three-volume set, hardback)
 
 
 
 .
 .
 
 .
 
 Ch. 3, "Kangxi's Consolidation," in Jonathan D. Spence, The Search for Modern China (New York: Norton; 3rd, 2013), pp. 48–71.

External links 
 

 
1654 births
1722 deaths
17th-century Chinese monarchs
18th-century Chinese monarchs
Child monarchs from Asia
Qing dynasty emperors
Shunzhi Emperor's sons